Pay Doldol may refer to:
 Pay Doldol, Golestan